Mafia City is a mobile game from Chinese developer Yotta Games. The gameplay involves constructing and levelling up buildings.

In August 2018 an advert for the game in which players were given the option to either "torture" or "finish" a female hostage was removed from Facebook and YouTube. The adverts are not representative of the gameplay.

The app was banned in India (along with other Chinese apps) on 2 September 2020 by the government, the move came amid the 2020 China-India skirmish.

Reception 
Upon its release, Mafia City spawned multiple advertisements alongside receiving a mixed reception from users and critics.

References 

2018 video games
Android (operating system) games
IOS games
Internet memes introduced in 2018
Organized crime video games
Video games developed in China
Video game memes
Cultural depictions of the Mafia
Internet censorship in India